Hard to Get may refer to:

"Hard to Get" (song), a 1955 song popularized by Gisele MacKenzie
"Hard to Get", a song by Katy B from On a Mission
"Hard to Get", a song by Sharyn Maceren
"Hard to Get", a song by Starclub
Hard to Get (1929 film), starring Jack Oakie 
Hard to Get (1938 film), featuring Olivia de Havilland, Dick Powell, and Bonita Granville